The men's association football tournament at the 2011 Pan Arab Games was held in Doha, Qatar from 10 to 23 December. The tournament was played at three venues in two host cities. Egypt were the defending champions from the 2007 Pan Arab Games in Cairo. Bahrain clinched the Gold Medal after beating Jordan 1–0.

Venues

Squads

Draw
The draw for the tournament was held on 30 October 2011 in Doha, Qatar.

Group stage
All times are Arabian Standard Time (AST) – UTC+3

Group A

Group B

Group C

Knockout stage

Semi-finals

Bronze medal match

Gold medal match

Final ranking

Scorers
4 goals
  Abdallah Deeb

3 goals
  Ismail Abdul-Latif

2 goals

  Sami Al-Husaini
  Bader Al-Mutawa
  Yousef Nasser
  Ashraf Nu'man

1 goal

  Fahad Hardan
  Mohamed Al-Alawi
  Salman Isa
  Hamza Al-Dardour
  Rakan Al-Khalidi
  Ali Al Kandari
  Fahad Al-Rashidi
  Hussain Al-Musawi
  Ihaab Boussefi
  Ismail Al-Amour
  Ali El-Khatib
  Imad Zatara
  Jaralla Al Marri
  Mohammed Razak
  Mohamed Abd Al Momen Ankba

1 own goal
  Hussam Abu Saleh

References

External links
 Official Page

2011
Pan Arab Games
Pan Arab Games, 2011
Events at the 2011 Pan Arab Games
Pan Arab Games